"Trouble" is a song by British female pop music duo Shampoo, released as the first single from their debut album, We Are Shampoo (1994). It peaked at  11 on the UK Singles Chart and reached the top 20 in Australia, Belgium, Finland and the Netherlands, as well as No. 37 in Canada. Attempting to break into the US market, the song was released as a promotional single for the 1995 film Mighty Morphin Power Rangers: The Movie, in anticipation of the release of the US version of We Are Shampoo. A new music video was filmed featuring clips from the Power Rangers film. NME magazine ranked "Trouble" at No. 23 on their list of the 50 best songs of 1994.

Release
The US promotional campaign for Shampoo, which centred on the single "Trouble", was described by Billboard as a massive effort. In addition to releasing the song as a promotion single for the Power Rangers film, 15,000 promotional cassettes of "Trouble" were given away at Wet Seal stores, as were coupons for the full album, and a video-reel containing music videos for "Trouble" and Shampoo's other singles, "Delicious" and "Viva La Megababes" was made, with the hopes of finding in-store play at over 200 music retail outlets.

Critical reception
Tom Demalon from AllMusic said that within seconds of hearing the track "most listeners will either be gleefully giggling along with the girls or scrambling for the stop button." While reviewing the Jawbreaker soundtrack, another editor, Doug Stone spoke favourably of the track, and Jonathan Bernstein from Spin described it as Shampoo's version of "No Sleep till Brooklyn", stating the song catapulted them to success, particularly in Japan. Larry Flick from Billboard stated the song was just as goofy as the Power Rangers film it was supporting, and that it would probably only be of interest to children and top 40 radio as a novelty. Caroline Sullivan from The Guardian said, "The music is in the pouting, yelping tradition of the Slits, cushioned by the most basic of backbeats. Fetching enough, but their self-conscious emphasis on the minutiae of adolescence ('School is boring, let's go home') is tiresome."

Chuck Campbell from Knoxville News Sentinel declared "Trouble" as "a romping tale of party girls who stay out too late and can't get home". In his weekly UK chart commentary, James Masterton commented, "Whether they can be any more than a summer novelty is open to question and I will watch with interest." Pan-European magazine Music & Media wrote, "Please meet Jacqui & Carrie. Headmasters beware of these schoolgirl versions of Polly Styrene (X-Ray Specs) and ex-Transvision Vamp Wendy James provoking with punky bubble gum pop." An editor, Robbert Tilli, compared their style to the likes of Bananarama, Transvision Vamp and Fuzzbox. Alan Jones from Music Week said, "Taking their cue from the B-52's, circa "Love Shack", Shampoo are not one of the most original bands around, but they are good fun. Sure to score."

Music videos
The original music video for the song was directed by Chris D'Adda. It features the girls trying to get home from central London after a night out, as their lyrics describe. The re-make music video to promote Mighty Morphin Power Rangers: The Movie features new footage of the girls singing to the camera, intercut with footage from the film.

Appearances
In addition to the Power Rangers film and soundtrack, the song featured on the soundtrack of the 1996 film Foxfire and the 1999 film Jawbreaker. The song is sung by characters in the 1997 film Blackrock, though it was not included on the film's soundtrack, and it also appears in episode three of the TV series Clueless. In 2007 the cast of the film St Trinians recorded a cover of the song, which was released on the film's soundtrack. The cast also recorded a music video for the song.

Zebrahead covered the song on their 2009 album Panty Raid. Lyrics from the song are referenced in the 2014 single "Double Bubble Trouble" by  M.I.A.

Track listing

Charts

Weekly charts

Year-end charts

Release history

References

1994 singles
1994 songs
20th Century Fox Records singles
Atlantic Records singles
Food Records singles
I.R.S. Records singles
Shampoo (duo) songs